Brian Price (born 30 October 1937) is a former Wales international rugby union player. Price first played international rugby for Wales in 1961 after impressing in the Barbarians squad against South African. He was selected for the 1966 British Lions tour of Australia and New Zealand playing in all four tests, and spent the majority of his career playing at club level for Newport. A teacher by profession he later became a journalist and sports presenter for radio and television. In 2006 he became President of the Former Player Association.

Rugby career 
Price was born in Deri near Bargoed in South Wales. After leaving national service he took a place at St Luke's College, Exeter and represented the college's rugby team. He also played for Cardiff College of Education, where he gained a teaching qualification, later becoming a PE and a Technical Drawing teacher at Thomas Richard Mining & Tech Institute in Tredegar and Caldicot Comprehensive.

After leaving education he played briefly for Cross Keys RFC before joining Newport in 1960. In early 1961 Price was part of the Newport team who narrowly lost to the touring South Africa squad. Less than a month later he was selected to play for the Barbarians against the same South African team, beating them 6–0. Uncapped at the time, his performance for the Barbarians saw him fast-tracked into the Wales international team playing against Ireland just a month later in the 1961 Five Nations Championship.

His Captained the club, most notably in the victory against the 1963 New Zealand All Blacks and attained 32 international caps for Wales including Triple Crown wins in 1965 and 1969 as Captain of Wales. He was selected for Wales' first overseas tour in 1964 and played in the Welsh rugby team's first match outside of Europe and its first in the Southern Hemisphere; played against East Africa in Nairobi on 12 May 1964, Wales winning 8-26.  He played 262 games for Newport in all.

Price also played for the British and Irish Lions on the 1966 tour of Australia and New Zealand.

Notes

Bibliography

External links
  BBC Sport Fiji Tour 1964

1937 births
Living people
Alumni of the University of Exeter
Barbarian F.C. players
British & Irish Lions rugby union players from Wales
Cross Keys RFC players
Newport RFC players
People from Bargoed
Rugby union players from Caerphilly County Borough
Wales international rugby union players
Wales rugby union captains
Welsh rugby union players
Welsh sports broadcasters
Rugby union locks